Diane Thome (born 1942) is an American composer. She studied piano with Dorothy Taubman and Orazio Frugoni and composition with Robert Strassburg, Roy Harris, Darius Milhaud, A.U. Boscovich, and Milton Babbitt.

Life and work 
Thome graduated with two undergraduate degrees from Eastman School of Music with distinction in piano and composition, a Master of Arts in theory and composition from the University of Pennsylvania and a Master of Fine Arts and Ph.D in composition from Princeton University. She was the first woman to receive a Ph.D. in music from Princeton University.

After completing her studies, Thome became a professor and then chair of the Composition Program at the University of Washington School of Music. Thome's compositions have been performed in Europe, China, Australia, Canada, Israel and the United States. She has been composer-in-residence at the University of Sussex and the Chamber Music Conference and Composers' Forum of the East (Bennington, Vermont). Her compositions have been featured on French radio. 

Thome has received commissions from organizations including the Bremerton Symphony Association, Seattle Symphony, New Jersey Symphony Orchestra, The Eleusis Consortium, The Esoterics, and Trimpin.

Honors and awards
1994 Washington Composer of the Year
1995-1996 Solomon Katz Distinguished Professor in the Humanities
1998 International Computer Music Conference Commission

Works
Thome has composed for solo instruments, chamber and choral ensembles, orchestra, and electronic media. Selected works include:

Pianismus for solo piano
Unseen Buds (1996)
Bright Air/Brilliant Fire (1997)
UnfoldEntwine (1998)
Like A Seated Swan (1999)

Her works have been recorded and issued on CD including 
Bright Air/Brilliant Fire Audio CD (2001), Centaur, ASIN:B00005Q479
Palaces of Memory Audio CD (1995), Centaur
Composers in the Computer Age (1993), Centaur, ASIN: B0000057VJ
America Sings Audio CD (1998) Leonarda Productions, Inc.
Sunbursts (1992) Capstone, Society of Composers, Inc.

References

1942 births
Living people
20th-century classical composers
American music educators
American women music educators
Women classical composers
Pupils of Darius Milhaud
American women in electronic music
20th-century women composers
Centaur Records artists